Dominique Bentejac (6 August 1944 – 27 December 2022) was a French equestrian. He competed at the 1972 Summer Olympics and the 1976 Summer Olympics.

References

1944 births
2022 deaths
French male equestrians
Olympic equestrians of France
Equestrians at the 1972 Summer Olympics
Equestrians at the 1976 Summer Olympics
Place of birth missing (living people)
20th-century French people